Jan Storms (20 December 1925 – 2 September 2019) was a Belgian racing cyclist. He rode in the 1950 Tour de France.

Major results

1949
 2nd GP Stad Zottegem
1950
 3rd La Flèche Wallonne
1952
 3rd Roubaix–Huy
 4th La Flèche Wallonne
 4th Overall Tour du Nord
 6th Omloop Het Volk
 7th Overall Tour de Luxembourg
 8th Schaal Sels
1953
 1st Bruxelles–Bost
 4th Liège–Bastogne–Liège
 6th La Flèche Wallonne
 7th Gent–Wevelgem
 7th Paris–Brussels
1954
 3rd Ronde van Brabant
 6th La Flèche Wallonne
1955
 1st Omloop van de Fruitstreek
 2nd GP Stad Vilvoorde
 3rd Road race, National Road Championships
 9th Paris–Brussels
 9th Ronde van Limburg
1956
 4th Scheldeprijs
1957
 2nd GP Victor Standaert
1960
 4th GP Stad Vilvoorde
1962
 9th Druivenkoers-Overijse
 10th Ronde van Limburg

References

1925 births
2019 deaths
Belgian male cyclists
20th-century Belgian people